Serrata beatrix is a species of sea snail, a marine gastropod mollusk in the family Marginellidae, the margin snails.

Description
The length of the shell attains 6.63 mm.

Distribution
This marine species occurs off New Caledonia

References

 Cossignani T. (2001) Descrizione di sei nuove marginelle (Gastropoda: Prosobranchia, Marginellidae e Cystiscidae) della Nuova Caledonia. Malacologia Mostra Mondiale 35: 12-17. 
 Boyer, F. (2008). The genus Serrata Jousseaume, 1875 (Caenogastropoda: Marginellidae) in New Caledonia. in: Héros, V. et al. (Ed.) Tropical Deep-Sea Benthos 25. Mémoires du Muséum national d'Histoire naturelle (1993). 196: 389-436

Marginellidae
Gastropods described in 2001